Kalicharan Sonkar is an Indian politician and activist for the Dalit people who is the Leader of Samajwadi Party. Hew was a co-founder of the Indian Justice Party with his brother Dr. Udit Raj  and was State President that party.

Kalicharan Sonkar is a former Member of the  Legislative Assembly from Chanbbey Constituency of Mirzapur, Uttar Pradesh. He joined the Samajwadi Party in April 2014.

Early life and education 
was born to a Khatik (schedule cast) family in Uttar Pradesh. He earned a BA and an LLB from Allahabad University and an MA from Jawaharlal Nehru University.

Sonkar became involved in Dalit politics in Uttar Pradesh, Uttrakhand, Madhya Pradesh and Bihar.

References 

1960 births
Living people
University of Allahabad alumni
Dalit activists
Justice Party (India) politicians
Samajwadi Party politicians